Sedrak A. Sedrakyan is an Armenian psychologist, doctor of Psychological Sciences, and professor.

Early life 
He was born on May 10, 1950, in Berkarat, Aragatsotn Province of Armenia. In 1967 he finished secondary school at Alaverdi Nalbandyan. From 1969 to 1974 he studied in the faculty of Philosophy, Sociology and Psychology of Yerevan State University (YSU). In 1979 he completed postgraduate studies at YSU. In 1981 he graduated from the Institute of Pedagogical Psychology of USSR Academy of Sciences. In 1987 he defended his thesis and was granted PhD in psychological sciences.

Career 
From 1974 to 1975 he was the head of the editorial-publishing, later sociological researches department of scientific methodical center of Armenian Soviet Socialist Republic Ministry of Culture. From 1976 to 1979 he worked as an assistant at YSU. In 1979 he became a lecturer and assistant professor.

In 1990 he completed a training course in Family and Group Psychotherapy in California, US.

In 1995 he was granted the title of full professor. In 2002 he completed the doctorate program at YSU, defended his doctoral dissertation and received a doctoral degree in psychological sciences.

From 1983 to 1990 he was Deputy Dean of the YSU Faculty of Philosophy, Sociology and Psychology. In 1991 he founded and became the Rector of the University of Practical Psychology and  Sociology “Urartu”, at the same time chairing the University Scientific Council. In 1999 founded and ran the “Association of Practical Psychologists of Armenia”.

He has been an official opponent of many dissertations and supervised many PhD candidates.

Public service 
He has carried out various public  activities. From 1977 to 1984 he was the Chairman of the Armenian branch of Young  Psychologists of the organization of USSR Psychologists. From 1980 to 1983 he was the president of the trade union of YSU philological faculty and was a member of the Scientific Council of the Faculty of Philology of YSU. In 1983 he became an Academic Council member and scientific secretary of the faculty of  Philosophy, Sociology and Psychology of YSU. From 1978 to 1980 he headed a student construction team in Armenia, later in 1979 in Hungary. In 1984 he led the delegation of Armenian young lecturers in Tunisia.

In 1990 he was elected as a member of the Council of International Psychologists. In 1996 he was appointed as a member of the Association of French Psychoanalysts and in 1997 as a member of Psychological Association of Canada.

From 1988 to 1993 he ran the “Center of Psychological Service” organized by Armenian Relief Society of Gyumri (aimed at helping people who had suffered from the earthquake in Spitak); throughout those years on his initiative nearly 60 psychologists and psychiatrists came to Armenia from the US, Canada, France, Russia, Georgia. He coordinated their professional work in the disaster zone.

From 1999 to 2002 he actively participated, as a psychologist-psychoanalyst, in the activities of the “Green House”of Children's Early Socialization Centerfounded by the French psychoanalytic organization.

Recognition 
In 2005 he was awarded a gold medal after A. Bakunts.

In 2015 on the 40th anniversary of his pedagogical activity he was awarded the gold medal of a humanist, Nobel Peace Prize laureate Fridtjof Nansen.

Selected publications

Books 
 S. A. Sedrakyan, V. Yedigaryan. Political Psychology, Yerevan, 2002
 S. A. Sedrakyan, V. Yedigaryan. Psychology of Management, Yerevan, 2004
 S. A. Sedrakyan. Family Psychology, Yerevan, 2010
 S. A. Sedrakyan. Social Psychology of Family, Moscow, 2011
 S. A. Sedrakyan. Family psychology, Methodological Analysis, Las Vegas, NV USA 2014
 S. A. Sedrakyan, A. Ghazarosyan, N. Hakobyan. The Psychological Activities in Educational Institutions (Manual), Yerevan, 2016
 S. A. Sedrakyan, Professional Competence of Teachers and Administration of General Education Institutions for Teaching Student With Disability as a Technology, Handbook of Research on Students’ Research Competence in Modern Educational Contexts, USA, 2018, p. 455-472

Articles 
 S. A. Sedrakyan. The Role of workers' dynasty in formation of professional interests and needs/ in collection of articles: “Psychological problems of improving the quality of educational work and the effectiveness of training students in secondary vocational (technical) schools”, Yerevan, 1977
 S. A. Sedrakyan. From the history of the study on the psychological problems of family/ in collection of: Union Conference on: “Actual problems of the history of psychology"(texts of reports), Yerevan, 1984, vol. II 
 S. A. Sedrakyan, Working family as a subject of succession of professional values/ in collection of articles:“The first Union School-Workshop on “Family and personality", M., 1984
 S. A. Sedrakyan. The ratio of the social to the psychological in the formation of working dynasties, “Banber” Bulletin of Yerevan University, 1989, N 3
 S. A. Sedrakyan. Armenian Soviet Psychology: “The development and the actual issues of research, Issues of Psychology", 1990, N1
 S. A. Sedrakyan. The Ratio of the social to the psychological in the process of formation oflabor dynasties; “Banber” Bulletin of Yerevan University "(in Armenian language), 1990, N3
 S. A. Sedrakyan. A Renowned scientist-psychologist / Yerevan University Journal, 1993
 S. A. Sedrakyan. Handicapped Children in Armenia/“Book of Abstracts”. Theme: New Trends and Developments in Psychology: Beginning the Next 50 Years of ISP 1994/
 S. A. Sedrakyan. Posttraumatic stress reactions after single and double trauma/ Acta Psychiatry scand 1994:0:1-8 Munksgaard1994
 S. A. Sedrakyan, G. Mouradyan. Moral-behavioral outburst during the natural disaster/ International Journal of Psychology. International Union of Psychological Science. Abstract of the XXVI International Congress of Psychology. Montreal, Canada 1996, p. 284/
 S. A. Sedrakyan. Manmade and natural disasters: A study of posttraumatic stress disorder, International Journal of Psychology. International Union of Psychological Science. Abstract of the XXVI InternationalCongress of Psychology. Montreal, Canada 1996, p. 284/
 S. A. Sedrakyan. Children's fears and the latters’ overcoming in the family / A World between War and Peace: Towards Healthy People, Families and Societies. Jerusalem, Israel. March 11–13, 1997, p. 41/
 S. A. Sedrakyan, N. Harutyunyan. Principal Causes of Conflicts in Armenian Families / A World between War and Peace: Towards Healthy People, Families and Societies Jerusalem, Israel. March 11–13, 1997, p. 113/
 S. A. Sedrakyan. The psychotherapy of words causing stress/ Psychological Bulletin"Soul", Yerevan, 1998
 S. A. Sedrakyan. The Soul: Old and new theories // Psychological Bulletin"Soul", Yerevan, 1998
 S. A. Sedrakyan, H. Hovhannisyan. Family Structure Variations under Extraordinary Conditions / Xth Word Family Therapy Congress, Düsseldorf, Germany, May 15–20, 1998/
 S. A. Sedrakyan. A family complex // the revolution of tiny steps, Yerevan, 1998
 S. A. Sedrakyan. "The requirements for psychological tests and the children’s version of the questionnaire “Ayzenk”/ journal "Psychology and Life", "Zangak-97" Pub. No. 1, 2000/
 S. A. Sedrakyan. "Gurgen Edilyan’s psychological views"/ Journal "Psychology and Life", "Zangak-97" Pub. No. 2, 2000/
 S. A. Sedrakyan, A. S. Katunyan. "H.M.Tutunjyan’s career and scientific contribution to history of psychology", journal "Psychology and Life", "Zangak-97" Pub. No. 3, 2000/
 S. A. Sedrakyan, N. A. Harutyunyan. "The reasons for emergence of intrafamilialconflicts and ways of overcoming them"/, journal" Psychology and Life ", "Zangak-97", Pub. No. 3, 2001/
 S. A. Sedrakyan. The problem of stress classification: personal and group stress counteractions/ journal "Psychology and Life", "Zangak-97" Pub. No. 3, 2007/
 S. A. Sedrakyan. The executive's role and activities in management/ "Economics" magazine 4, 2007/
 S. A. Sedrakyan. The contemporary problems of socio-psychological study of the family/ Journal "Psychology and Life", "Zangak-97" Pub. No. 3-4, 2008/
 S. A. Sedrakyan, H. L. Petrosyan. The role of family therapy in overcoming fears of junior pupils / Journal "Psychology and Life", "Zangak-97" Pub. No. 3-4, 2009/
 S. A. Sedrakyan, A. R. Muradyan.  Role clashes and manifestations of role competency in intrafamilial relations / Journal "Psychology and Life", "Zangak-97" Pub. No. 1-2, 2011/
 S. A. Sedrakyan, H. L. Kirakosyan. Psychological consequesnces and the manifestation features of the earthquake/ Journal "Psychology and Life", "Zangak-97", Yerevan, N 3–4, 2011/
 S. A. Sedrakyan. The Origin of Family roles and its ratio to self-consciousness/,materials from international conference of "Contemporary problems of theoretical and applied psychology", Yerevan, 2011/
 S. A. Sedrakyan. Family as a social group and its socio-psychological structure/ Family psychology and family therapy", 3, Moscow, 2011/
 S. A. Sedrakyan. The types and levels of intrafamilial crises/, Journal "Psychology and Life", "Zangak-97" Pub. No. 3-4, 2012/
 S. A. Sedrakyan. The principle of transfer in the context of family roles / materials from international scientific conference of "Contemporary problems of theoretical and applied psychology", Yerevan, 2013/
 S. A. Sedrakyan, A. R.Avagyants. The issue of Psychological counseling on the borderline of mental health/ materials from international scientific conference of "Contemporary problems of theoretical and applied psychology", Yerevan, 2013/
 S. A. Sedrakyan, A. A. Stepanyan. On the issue of family functions (methodological analysis)/ Scientific journal of inter-university consortium "Pedagogy and Psychology Issues", No. 3, 2013/
 S. A. Sedrakyan,  A. N. Mnatsakanyan. The impact of parental attitude towards children with special needs on the efficiency ofinclusive education/ Scientific journal of intra-university Consortium "Pedagogy and Psychology Issues", No. 3, pp. 124–129, Yerevan 2014
 S. A. Sedrakyan. Intrafamilial adjustment and family creation/ V International scientific conference of "Contemporary problems of theoretical and applied psychology", Yerevan State University, 2015/
 S. A. Sedrakyan, M. Tozalakyan. The family's involvement in comprehensive treatment of children with obsessive-compulsive disorders based on clinical experience/ V International scientific conference of "Contemporary problems of theoretical and applied psychology", Yerevan State University, pp. 270–272, Yerevan, 2015/
 S. A. Sedrakyan. Sociometry and Familial Status-Role Relations, /Wisdom, Yerevan State Pedagogical University/, pp. 118–123, Yerevan 2015
S.A Sedrakyan.  Professional competence of teachers and administration of general education institutions for teaching student with disability as a technology(p. 144-169) Handbook of Research on Students' Research Competence in Modern Educational Contexts, Hershey, PA, USA: IGI Global.2018

References 

1950 births
Living people
Armenian psychologists
Yerevan State University alumni
Academic staff of Yerevan State University